Per Arvid Ingemar Hedenius (5 April 1908 – 30 April 1982) was a Swedish philosopher. He was Professor of Practical Philosophy at Uppsala University (1947–1973). He was a famous opponent of organised Christianity. The Swedish Humanist Association, known in Sweden as "Humanisterna", offers the Ingemar Hedenius Award each year to support humanist ideas and critical thinking.

Background

Hedenius' grandfather Per Hedenius (1828–1896) was a famous professor of pathology and for a while rector of Uppsala University. His father Israel Hedenius (1868–1932) was in 1900 a doctor of medicine and teacher of medical practice, and in 1927 was appointed personal physician to the King of Sweden. Hedenius' mother, born Anna Bergh, was from an upper class Norwegian family.

The two married in 1905 and had three children: Per (1905), Ingemar and Ann Marie (1909). Both parents were very religious.

Ingemar took the entrance examination for the Norra Latin school in 1927. After he completed upper secondary school he studied at Uppsala University where he wrote his doctoral thesis Sensationalism and theology in Berkeley's philosophy, discussing the philosophy of George Berkeley. On 8 June 1979 Hedenius received an honorary doctorate from the Faculty of Theology  at Uppsala University, Sweden.

Svante Nordin, professor of history of science and ideas at Lund University, published a book in 2004 called Ingemar Hedenius: en filosof och hans tid (Ingemar Hedenius: a philosopher and his time). This gives a picture of Ingemar Hedenius based on a rich collection of letters and other documents. According to the text at the back of the book, Hedenius was "a person with strong musical, artistic and literary interests. He liked to play the flute, including performing in public. [...] harsh both in writing and in speech with enemies and opponents, gentle and sensitive with his friends."

Hedenius was from 1957 till 1960 publisher of the bimonthly magazine Kulturkontakt, a publication of the CIA-backed Congress of Cultural Freedom and the Svenska kommittén för kulturens frihet (Swedish Committee for Cultural Freedom).

Belief and knowledge
Hedenius became best known for his book Tro och vetande (Belief and Knowledge), published in  1949. This book started off one of the most wide-ranging cultural debates ever in Sweden. The debate was about the truthfulness of the teachings of Christianity and also about the position of the church in society. He rejected organised Christianity, especially the established role of the Church of Sweden. In Belief and Knowledge he described three postulates which theology does not comply with, to show that it is not possible to have a rational debate about religion. According to Hedenius this means that theology can not be classed as knowledge, but belongs outside it as "quasi-knowledge":

The religion-psychology postulate: A religious belief contains metaphysical assumptions which science can neither verify nor falsifyfor example, assertions of the existence of God, or the immortality of the soul.
The language-theory postulate: It must be possible to communicate the religious comprehension and experience even to non-believers.
The logic postulate: Two truths cannot contradict each other. Of two contradictory statements, at most one can be true. Theology not only contains theses which contradict what we know about reality (contrary to the religion-psychology postulate) but also accepts inner contradictionsfor example, the oldest and according to Hedenius also insoluble problem of evil.

Hedenius was of the opinion that Christianity violates these rules and is therefore irrational. Amongst other things, he proposed that the study of religions and their development should be separated from theology and become a non-religious academic discipline.

Works 
 Om rätt och moral (1941)
 Om praktisk filosofi (1948)
 Tro och vetande (1949)
 Att välja livsåskådning (1951)
 Tro och livsåskådning (1958)
 Helvetesläran (1972)
 Samtal med Ingemar Hedenius (in part with Sven Ragne Carlson) (1975)

References

1908 births
1982 deaths
People from Uppsala Municipality
Academic staff of Uppsala University
Critics of Christianity
Swedish atheists
Swedish atheism activists
Burials at Uppsala old cemetery
Analytic philosophers
20th-century Swedish philosophers